Kim Myeong-sik (September 26, 1890 - April 11, 1943) was a Korean independence activist and writer during the period of Japanese occupation. He joined the editorial committee of the Donga Ilbo in 1920. In the same year, he formed the Korean Workers' League (노동공제회) with others including Pak Jung-hwa and Jang Deok-su and published the league magazine Gongje. In 1922, he was arrested and imprisoned for two years by the Japanese government, due to his involvement with the magazine New Life (신생활) which was managed by Pak Hui-do.

He issued the anthology Cangue of the American Empire in 1996. It demands that Japan become anti-American. Moreover, he insists that Japan should do the apology and compensation to Korea.

Notes

References

See also
Korean literature
Korea under Japanese rule
List of Korean independence activists

1890 births
1943 deaths
Korean writers
Korean independence activists